The Pouawa River is a river of the Gisborne Region of New Zealand's North Island.

See also
List of rivers of New Zealand

References

Rivers of the Gisborne District
Rivers of New Zealand